{{Infobox beauty pageant
|photo= Miss International Queen 2020 finalists.jpg
|caption=From left: Thailand, Mexico, Brazil
|winner=Valentina Fluchaire|date=7 March 2020
|presenters=Piyawat KempetchSaraichatt Jirapatt
|acts=Jazell Barbie Royale
|entrants=21
|placements=12
|venue=Pattaya, Chonburi, Thailand
|broadcaster=Channel 3 (Thailand)
|best national costume=Wanie Mohtar
|congeniality=Gebby Vesta
|photogenic=Jess Labares
|before=2019
|next=2022
|returns=
|withdraws=
|debuts=
}}Miss International Queen 2020, the 15th Miss International Queen pageant, was held on 7 March 2020, at Pattaya, Chonburi in Thailand. Jazell Barbie Royale of the United States crowned her successor, Valentina Fluchaire of Mexico at the end of the event.

 Results Notes:§ – placed into the Top 12 by winning Most Popular Introductory Video

 Special awards 

 Best in Talent 

 Contestants 
21 contestants competed for the title.

 Debuts 
  Returns 
Last competed in 2018:
   Last competed in 2015:
 Last competed in 2010:

 Last competed in 2004:
  Withdrawals 
       '''

References

External links 
 

2020 beauty pageants
2020
Beauty pageants in Thailand